Dora Barton (née Brockbank; 20 January 1880 – 13 September 1966) was an English actress who appeared in films between 1916 and 1938.

She was the daughter of actress Mary Barton and the sister of actress Naomi Barton.

She married actor Anthony Caton Woodville—the son of Richard Caton Woodville Jr. and grandson of Richard Caton Woodville—in 1908 but they later divorced. They had a son, Humphrey Caton Woodville, an entomologist.

Selected filmography
 Dr. Wake's Patient (1916)
 The Answer (1916)
 The Green Orchard (1916)
 The House Opposite (1917)
 The Infamous Lady (1928)
 The Bondman (1929)
 The Price of a Song (1935)
 The Cardinal (1936)

References

External links

1880 births
1966 deaths
English film actresses
English silent film actresses
Actresses from London
20th-century English actresses